National Institute of Mass Communication is a state owned educational institute that specializes in mass communication and journalism in Bangladesh. Its headquarters are located at A, A. W. Chowdhury Road, Darus Salam Thana, Dhaka. Shahin Islam, ndc is the incumbent director general of the institute.

History
National Institute of Mass Communication was established in 1980 as the National Broadcasting Academy. In 1984, according to the recommendation of the Martial Law Committee, of the regime of General Hussain Mohammad Ershad, the National Broadcasting Academy was renamed to National Institute of Mass Communication. Aside from providing courses related to communication the institute also carries out research into mass media. It is under the Ministry of Information.

References

Research institutes in Bangladesh
1980 establishments in Bangladesh
Organisations based in Dhaka
Mass media in Bangladesh
Universities and colleges in Dhaka